Presque Isle County is a county in the Lower Peninsula of the U.S. state of Michigan. As of the 2020 Census, the population was 12,982. The county seat is Rogers City. The county was authorized by state legislative action on April 1, 1840, but the county government was not established until 1871. The government was reorganized in 1875.

Both the county and Presque Isle Township are named for Presque Isle (French, "almost an island"; the term for a narrow peninsula). A large part of the township consists of that peninsula, with Lake Huron on the east, Grand Lake on the west, and narrow strips of land connecting it to the mainland at the north and south ends. The community of Presque Isle is near the center of this peninsula.

History

Early Native Americans living in the area were nomadic, using the land as hunting grounds. To them the land between the Ocqueoc and Swan Rivers was sacred ground. The name "Presque Isle" was given to the area by fur traders who portaged over the strip of land that attaches Presque Isle to the mainland.

Early development of the area was delayed because it had no navigable river. The Ocqueoc River was Presque Isle's largest river but it was shallow and crooked, with many rapids. In the spring of 1839 a surveying party, contracted by the state of Michigan, reported that the land of this area was worthless. This further discouraged development until the 1860s when the Crawford family settled into a quiet cove of Lake Huron, south of present-day Rogers City. They intended to develop a stone quarry, but found the stone too flaky to be used as building material. Turning to lumbering, they sold the wood to steamers traveling the Great Lakes.

In 1868 W.E. Rogers, an Army officer, organized a surveying party to Presque Isle, with Albert Molitor as supervisor. Seeing the huge forests, they attempted to purchase Crawford's Quarry but were refused. They formed the Molitor-Rogers Company purchasing the land at the site of Rogers City. The following year a large party of German and Polish immigrants arrived and settled in the area. The Molitor-Rogers Company built a sawmill, store, boarding house, and blacksmith shop. The small city was solely supplied by the company. After a difficult winter in 1870–71, the community began to thrive.

The county's original settlers were lumbermen, fishermen and farmers. In 1907 a mining engineer/geologist from New York, H.H. Hindshaw, visited Crawford's Quarry and found it to be rich in limestone. Following this discovery, the Michigan Limestone and Chemical Company of Calcite, Michigan, was founded. The company purchased  at Calcite, the new name for Crawford's Quarry. Needing a means of shipping their product, the Bradley Transportation Company was formed. The company is known in the area for being the chief business, employing a significant portion of the area's residents. One of the darker aspects of the county's history involved the Bradley Transportation Company when one of their cargo ships, the Carl D. Bradley sank on Lake Michigan during a windstorm in November 1958 with the loss of 33 lives, 28 of whom resided in Presque Isle County (23 were from Rogers City, three were from Onaway and two were from Posen or Metz Township).

Today the world's largest limestone processing plant is in Rogers City, which is also a major Great Lakes Port. This is the best natural harbor on Lake Huron between Port Huron and Mackinaw City.

Geography
Although Presque Isle County is on Michigan's Lower Peninsula, it is considered to be part of Northern Michigan.

Geographic features
 Ocqueoc Falls
 Sacred Rock

Lakes

 Grand Lake (Presque Isle, Michigan)       
 Long Lake (Preque Isle, Michigan)    
 Black Lake
 Sunken Lake
 Tomahawk Creek Flood
 Rainy Lake
 Ocqueoc Lake

Adjacent counties
By land

 Alpena County (southeast)
 Montmorency County (southwest)
 Cheboygan County (west)

By water

 Mackinac County (northwest)
 Chippewa County (north)
 Manitoulin District, Ontario, Canada (east)

Transportation

Air
There is one county-owned airport in Presque Isle County,  providing access to general aviation:
 Presque Isle County Airport – located SW of Rogers City

The nearest commercial airline airports are Alpena County Regional Airport near Alpena, and Cherry Capital Airport near (Traverse City).

Major highways

Demographics

As of the 2000 United States Census, of 2000, there were 14,411 people, 6,155 households, and 4,203 families residing in the county. The population density was 22 people per square mile (8/km2). There were 9,910 housing units at an average density of 15 per square mile (6/km2). The county's racial makeup was 98.07% White, 0.26% Black or African American, 0.59% Native American, 0.16% Asian, 0.01% Pacific Islander, 0.09% from other races, and 0.82% from two or more races. 0.55% of the population were Hispanic or Latino of any race. 28.5% were of German, 28.2% Polish, 7.9% English, 6.3% American, 5.6% French and 5.6% Irish ancestry. 95.7% spoke English and 3.1% Polish as their first language.

There were 6,155 households, of which 24.50% had children under age 18 living with them, 58.80% were married couples living together, 6.30% had a female householder with no husband present, and 31.70% were non-families. 28.40% of all households were made up of individuals, and 14.50% had someone living alone who was 65 years of age or older. The average household size was 2.31 and the average family size was 2.80.

The county population contained 20.90% under the age of 18, 6.50% from 18 to 24, 22.40% from 25 to 44, 27.80% from 45 to 64, and 22.30% who were 65 years of age or older. The median age was 45 years. For every 100 females there were 99.20 males. For every 100 females age 18 and over, there were 97.10 males.

The median income for a household in the county was $31,656, and the median income for a family was $37,426. Males had a median income of $31,275 versus $20,625 for females. The per capita income for the county was $17,363. About 6.80% of families and 10.30% of the population were below the poverty line, including 13.10% of those under age 18 and 9.20% of those over age 64.

Government
Voters in Presque Isle County have generally favored Republican Party nominees. Since 1884, the Republican nominee has garnered the county's vote 71% of the time (24 of 34 elections).

The county government operates the jail, maintains rural roads, operates the major local courts, records deeds, mortgages, and vital records, administers public health regulations, and participates with the state in the provision of social services. The county board of commissioners controls the budget and has limited authority to make laws or ordinances. In Michigan, most local government functions – police and fire, building and zoning, tax assessment, street maintenance etc. – are the responsibility of individual cities and townships.

Elected officials

 Prosecuting Attorney: Kenneth A. Radzibon
 Sheriff: Joseph Brewbaker
 County Clerk: Ann Marie Main
 County Treasurer: Bridget LaLonde
 Register of Deeds: Vicky Kowalewsky
 Drain Commissioner: Robert G. Macomber
 County Surveyor: Norman J. Quaine Jr.

as of June 2021

Historical markers
There are ten recognized Michigan historical markers in the county:

 Bearinger Union School
 Burnham's Landing
 Elowsky Mill
 Forty Mile Point Lighthouse / Graveyard of Ships
 Lake Huron
 The Metz Fire
 Old Presque Isle Lighthouse
 Presque Isle Electric Cooperative Monument
 Presque Isle Light Station
 World's Largest Limestone Quarry

Media

Newspapers
 The Alpena News is the daily newspaper of record for much of the northeastern Lower Peninsula.
 The Presque Isle County Advance is the weekly newspaper of Presque Isle County.

Television
The following television stations broadcast in Presque Isle County:
 Channel 4: WTOM-TV "TV 7&4" (NBC) (Cheboygan; satellite of WPBN-TV, Traverse City)
 Channel 6: WCML "CMU Public Television" (PBS) (Alpena; satellite of WCMU-TV, Mount Pleasant)
 Channel 8: WGTQ "ABC 29&8" (ABC) (Sault Ste. Marie; satellite of WGTU, Traverse City)
 Channel 10: WWUP-TV "9&10 News" (CBS) (Sault Ste. Marie; satellite of WWTV, Cadillac)
 Channel 11: WBKB-TV "Channel 11 News" (CBS) (Alpena)
 Channel 45: WFUP "Fox 32" (Fox) (Vanderbilt; satellite of WFQX-TV Cadillac).

Radio
The following radio stations can be heard in Rogers City
FM

AM

NOAA Weather Radio
NOAA Weather Radio can be heard on 162.550 MHz (Call Sign KIG83, Alpena)

Communities

Cities
 Onaway
 Rogers City (county seat)

Villages
 Millersburg
 Posen

Civil townships

 Allis Township
 Bearinger Township
 Belknap Township
 Bismarck Township
 Case Township
 Krakow Township
 Metz Township
 Moltke Township
 North Allis Township
 Ocqueoc Township
 Posen Township
 Presque Isle Township
 Pulawski Township
 Rogers Township

Census-designated place
 Presque Isle Harbor

Other unincorporated communities
 Hawks
 Leroy
 Liske
 Manitou Beach
 Metz

See also
 List of Michigan State Historic Sites in Presque Isle County, Michigan
 National Register of Historic Places listings in Presque Isle County, Michigan

Footnotes

References

External links
 Presque Isle County website Presque Isle County website
 Enchanted forest Enchanted forest, Northern Michigan source for information, calendars etc.
 

 
Michigan counties
1875 establishments in Michigan
Populated places established in 1875